Michael Klinkert (born 7 July 1968) is a German former professional footballer who played as a defender.

Honours
Borussia Mönchengladbach
 DFB-Pokal: 1994–95; runner-up: 1991–92

References

External links
 

1968 births
Living people
Association football defenders
German footballers
Germany under-21 international footballers
Germany youth international footballers
1. FC Saarbrücken players
FC Schalke 04 players
Borussia Mönchengladbach players
Bundesliga players
2. Bundesliga players
20th-century German people
People from Saarlouis (district)
Footballers from Saarland
West German footballers